Suzan (also Romanized as Sūzān) is a village in Javersiyan Rural District, Qareh Chay District, Khondab County, Markazi Province, Iran. At the 2006 census, its population was 782, in 207 families.

References 

Populated places in Khondab County